Bester Bube ("Best Bower") or Fünfkart ("Five Cards") is an historical German card game for 3–6 players played with a Piquet pack. It is one of the Rams group of card games characterised by allowing players to drop out of the current game if they think they will be unable to win any tricks or a minimum number of tricks. It may be an ancestor of Five-Card Loo.

Names 
The game goes under a variety of dialectical names, some named after the top card the "Best Bower"; these include Bester Bube or Bester Bauer (High German); Bester Buern or Bester Buur (Hamburg); Besten Buur (Holsteinish) or Beste Boer(en) (Dutch). Alternatively it may be named after the five cards dealt to a hand e.g. Fünfkart (High German), Fiefkarten; Fiefkaart, Fiefkort or Fiefander (Holsteinish). A third name relates to the flush or sequence that sometimes scores in the game; these include Lenter (East Frisian); Lenterspiel (Low German); Lanterlu, Lanturlu or Lanterlui (Dutch). The latter is clearly related to the English name of the game Lanterloo.

History 
The game is recorded in the 18th and 19th centuries in German and Dutch game anthologies and dictionaries,  appearing as early as 1781, in a Low German dictionary where it is equated with Lenter-Spiel, and in 1785, as Bestebauer-Spiel, a game with its aficionados in Göttingen. In 1802 it is mentioned as a "people's card game" in a Holstein dialect dictionary, both as "Lenter" and "Besten Buur", and buuren is described as "playing the card game of besten Bauren [sic], in which the Spadenbuur or Pique Bauer ("Jack of Spades", also figuratively a foolish person) is the highest card which beats all the others." It is also recorded in 1808 in Das neue königliche l'Hombre as "Bester Bube" and Von Alvensleben includes it in his 1853 Encyclopädie der Spiele. It is still current in the 1905 edition of Meyer's Großes Konversations-Lexikon, but by 1950 it appears to have dropped out of favour, being then described by Culbertson and Hoyle as "an obsolete card game similar to Loo". The games scholar David Parlett includes it in his 2008 Book of Card Games, but agrees that it is "defunct".

It appears to be a regional game: Parlett suggests it was played in the south and west of Germany, but it is also recorded in north Germany, for example in the area of Celle in Lower Saxony and in Hamburg, where it also appears to have been known as Bester Buern or Bester Buur. Its rules are first recorded in Das neue königliche l'Hombre in 1808 and then appear in a Dutch card game handbook of 1810 as Beste Boer or Lanterlu, and subsequently as Beste Boeren or Lanterlui in 1828 and 1844. The game was known in the East Frisian dialect as Lenter, which also referred to the possession of five trumps in the game, also called a Bauerchen, or to the five top trumps. Lenter was equated to the English Lanterloo or Lanteraloo and the Dutch Lanterlu or Lanturlu, and the Holsteinisches Idiotikon of 1800 also states that the Bower of Spades was the highest trump, indicating that in the earliest rules there was just one fixed top trump card, unlike the later rules which introduce 2 variable ones and more complex rules. In Holstein, the game was also called Fiefkaart or Fiefander.

Bester Bube may be related to Juckerspiel and hence Euchre; the last was described by Parlett as "characterised by the promotion of two Jacks to topmost position as Right and Left Bowers, a feature variously represented or paralleled in late 18th-early 19th century west German games such as Réunion, Bester Bube and Kontraspiel."

Bester Bube (pronounced "Boober") means "Best Jack" or "Best Bower" (the original names Bester Buur or Bester Bauer meant "best farmer") and is named after its highest card, originally the Jack of Spades, but later the trump Jack. The second highest trump is the jack of the same suit colour, the Unterbube ("Under Bower" or "Under Jack") or Nebenbube ("Side Bower" or "Side Jack").

Although Bester Bube is sometimes equated in the literature with Five Cards (Fiefkort, Fünfkart, etc.), the latter may have been played without the feature of two top Jacks and hence why Seelmann, in commenting on Reuter's 1867 work, De Reis’ nah Konstantinopel, reports that Fünfkart "was mostly called Fiefkort mit'n besten Buren."

Rules 
Bester Bube is played between 3 to 6 players using a 32-card Piquet pack of French-suited cards. The following rules are based on von Alvensleben.

In the trump suit, cards rank as follows: Best Bower, Under Bower, Ace, King, Queen, Ten, Nine, Eight, Seven; and, in the remaining suits: Ace, King, Queen, (Jack), Ten, Nine, Eight, Seven.

Dealing 
The first dealer is the player who draws the lowest card from the pack. The dealer antes five chips to the pot, shuffles the pack, offers it to the player to the left to cut and then deals five cards to each player, anticlockwise, in packets of 3, then 2. The next card is turned for trumps.

Dropping out 
After the first deal and after reviewing their hands, players may choose to "play" or "pass" provided there is more than the dealer's ante of five chips in the pool. The first deal is a 'force' in which everyone must play.

Exchanging 
Forehand, the player to the dealer's right, exchanges as many cards as desired with the talon. Forehand is followed by the remaining players in anticlockwise order. This continues until everyone has had 2 opportunities to exchange or the talon is exhausted. The talon is then placed to one side.

The trump face-up belongs to the dealer who may exchange cards in the same way as the others before exchanging with the trump card. It is thus a major advantage to be the dealer.

Play 
Players must follow suit if able; otherwise are free to play any card. There are additional rules for the first two tricks as follows:

 First trick. Forehand must lead with the Best Bower or, if that is not held, any other trump card. Lacking both, forehand may play any card face down and announce "Trump!" If another player has the Best Bower, it must be played to the first trick, with the exception of rearhand (the dealer), who has the right to keep it provided he or she can win the trick with another trump.

 Second trick. The winner of the first trick must lead a trump to the second in like manner. Whoever holds the Under Bower (the one of the same suit colour as the trump Jack) must play it with the exception of the dealer who may hold it back if able to win the trick with another trump.

For the third, fourth and fifth tricks, the winner of the previous trick may lead any card.

Scoring 
Players win one chip for each trick taken. A player who fails to win any tricks is bête and has to pay a penalty equivalent to the contents of the pot. All bêtes are paid in at once, but if the pool becomes too large, it may be agreed that they can be paid in successive deals. Players may pass if there is a bête in the pool, but all must play if it only holds the basic ante. The earliest rules suggest the bête increases each time in from 5 chips to 10, 15, 20 and so on.

Footnotes

References

Literature 
 _ (1808). Das neue Königliche l’Hombre nebst einer gründlichen Anweisung wie Quadrille..., J.G. Herold, Frankfurt and Leipzig
 _ (1821). Nieuwe beschrijving der meest gebruikelijke kaartspelen, zoo als die hier te lande gespeeld worden. H. Moolenijzer, Amsterdam.
 _ (1907). Korrespondenzblatt des Vereins für niederdeutsche Sprachforschung, Volumes 28-33.
 _ (1967). Schleswig-Holstein, Schleswig-Holsteinischer Heimatbund.
 Culbertson, Ely and Edmond Hoyle (1950). Culbertson's Hoyle: The New Encyclopedia of Games. Greystone Press.
 Dähnert, Johann Carl (1781). Platt-deutsches Wörter-Buch: nach der alten und neuen Pommerschen und Rügischen Mundart, Christian Lorenz Struck, Stralsund. 
 List, Gottlieb Christian Heinrich (1785). Beyträge zur Statistik von Göttingen. Berlin.
 Mensing, Otto (1928). Schleswig-Holsteinisches Wörterbuch, Vol. 2 (F–J), Neumünster: Wachholtz.
 Meyer, Adolf and Hans Türschmann (2004). Endeholz: Quellen und Darstellungen zur Geschichte des Dorfes und seiner Einwohner, Türschmann, Endeholz.

 Parlett, David (2008). The Penguin Book of Card Games, Penguin, London. 
 Seelmann, Prof. Dr. Wilhelm, ed. (1880). Reuters Werke, Vol. 6. Leipzig, Vienna: Bibliographisches Institut.
 Schütze, Johann Friedrich (1800). Holsteinisches Idiotikon, Part 1 (Buuren), Villaume, Hamburg.
 Schütze, Johann Friedrich (1802). Holsteinisches Idiotikon, Part 3 (Lenter), Villaume, Hamburg.
 Stürenburg, Cirk Heinrich (1857). Ostfriesisches Wörterbuch. Carl Otto Sende, Aurich.
 Von Alvensleben, L. (1853). Encyclopädie der Spiele. Otto Wigand, Leipzig.
 Wachholtz, K. (1910). Korrespondenzblatt des Vereins für Niederdeutsche Sprachforschung, Volume 30. 

Euchre group
German card games
French deck card games
18th-century card games
Multi-player card games
Dutch card games